Whorton Township is one of 21 inactive townships in Madison County, Arkansas, USA.  As of the 2010 census, its population was 418.

References

Townships in Madison County, Arkansas
Townships in Arkansas